Coptops nigropunctata is a species of beetle in the family Cerambycidae. It was described by Fairmaire in 1871, originally as C. nigropunctatus. It is known from Comoros.

References

nigropunctata
Beetles described in 1871